The 1932 Montana State Bobcats football team was an American football team that represented Montana State College (later renamed Montana State University) in the Rocky Mountain Conference (RMC) during the 1932 college football season. In its fifth season under head coach Schubert R. Dyche, the team compiled a 3–3–1 record (0–3 against RMC opponents) and was outscored by a total of 59 to 46.

Schedule

References

Montana State
Montana State Bobcats football seasons
Montana State Bobcats football